Calilena restricta is a species of funnel weaver in the family of spiders known as Agelenidae. It is found in the USA.

Subspecies
These two subspecies belong to the species Calilena restricta:
 Calilena restricta dixiana Chamberlin & Ivie, 1941 i c g
 Calilena restricta restricta Chamberlin & Ivie, 1941 i g
Data sources: i = ITIS, c = Catalogue of Life, g = GBIF, b = Bugguide.net

References

Agelenidae
Articles created by Qbugbot
Spiders described in 1941